Vladimir Nikolayevich Sakharov (born February 5, 1948, in Palatka, Russia) is a retired Soviet football player.

Honours
 Soviet Top League winner: 1976 (autumn).

International career
Sakharov made his debut for USSR on October 12, 1975, in a UEFA Euro 1976 qualifier against Switzerland (USSR did not qualify for the final tournament).

References

External links
  Profile

1948 births
Living people
Soviet footballers
Soviet Union international footballers
Soviet Top League players
PFC Krylia Sovetov Samara players
FC Torpedo Moscow players
Association football midfielders
FC Dinamo Minsk players